Bentley Station Meadow is a  biological Site of Special Scientific Interest south of Bentley in Hampshire.

This area of unimproved herb-rich grassland is dominated by cock's-foot, Yorkshire fog and tufted hairgrass. There is a very rich invertebrate fauna, especially hoverflies and butterflies. Hoverflies include the uncommon  Sphaerophoria taeniata and Xanthogramma citrofasiatum, while there are 22 species of breeding butterflies.

A public footpath to Bentley railway station goes through the meadow.

References

Sites of Special Scientific Interest in Hampshire